Nabipur is a village in Bharuch district in the Indian state of Gujarat.

Demographics
 India census, Nabipur had a population of 6,064. Males constitute 51.34% of the population and females 48.66%. Nabipur has an average literacy rate of 82.03%: male literacy is 87.81%, and female literacy is 75.91%. In Nabipur, 10.07% of the population is under 6 years of age.

Transport

Railway
Nabipur railway station is located on the Western Railway Mumbai – Vadodara Segment. It is 12 km from Bharuch, 58 km from Vadodara.

References

Villages in Bharuch district